Anilios aspina, also known as the no-spined blind snake, is a species of blind snake that is endemic to Australia. The specific epithet aspina (“without spines”) refers to the snake's diagnostic lack of a terminal tail spine.

Description
The species grows to an average of about 28 cm in length.

Behaviour
The species is oviparous.

Distribution and habitat
The snake inhabits the Mitchell Grass Downs of central Queensland. The type locality is Margot Station, some 20 km north of Barcaldine.

References

aspina
Snakes of Australia
Reptiles of Queensland
Taxa named by Patrick J. Couper
Taxa named by Jeanette Covacevich
Reptiles described in 1998